Ponce City Market is a mixed-use development located in a former Sears catalogue facility in Atlanta, with national and local retail anchors, restaurants, a food hall, boutiques and offices, and residential units. It is located adjacent to the intersection of the BeltLine with Ponce de Leon Avenue in the Old Fourth Ward near Virginia Highland, Poncey-Highland and Midtown neighborhoods. The  building, one of the largest by volume in the Southeast United States, was used by Sears, Roebuck and Co. from 1926–1987 and later by the City of Atlanta as "City Hall East". Ponce City Market officially opened on August 25, 2014. It was listed on the National Register of Historic Places in 2016.

Occupants
The complex contains offices, apartments, a gourmet food hall, retail stores, educational facilities, and a rooftop amusement park.

Larger retail stores include Anthropologie, Citizen Supply, J. Crew, Williams Sonoma, and West Elm. Ponce City Market states that its food hall is similar to the famous Chelsea Market, New York City, also owned by Jamestown. James Beard-awarded chefs with presence in the food hall include Anne Quatrano of Bacchanalia/Star Provisions, Linton Hopkins of Restaurant Eugene, and Sean Brock of Charleston, S.C.'s Husk restaurant.

Prominent office occupants include the parent company of the global marketing platform service MailChimp, Pinterest, Rocket Science Group, and the educational website HowStuffWorks.

History

Origins
The building was built on the site of Ponce de Leon Springs, later the Ponce de Leon amusement park.

As Sears, Roebuck
 From 1926 to 1979, it was a Sears, Roebuck and Co. retail store, warehouse and regional office. The Atlanta regional headquarters was closely linked to Sears' efforts to capture the market of Southern farmers through the Sears Agricultural Foundation:
From August 1926 until October 1928, the Foundation hosted a radio show, broadcast from the Atlanta Sears tower called "Dinner Bell R.F.D.". R.F.D. stood for the club "Radio Farmers' Democracy. The show aired on WSB radio between noon and 1 pm three times a week, featuring old-time musicians and string bands
Sears held a farmer's market at the back of the property starting in May 1930 through New Year's Day 1947
In 1939, the market hosted the First Georgia Clay Products Show, which garnered an audience of 5,000
The market established partnerships with local 4-H Clubs and Future Farmers of America clubs
 In 1979, the retail store closed but the building continue operating as a Sears regional office until 1987.

As City Hall East

 In May 1990, the city of Atlanta bought the building for $12 million, with plans to place 2,000 police and fire employees there, and later rent space out to county, state, and federal agencies. The city subsequently moved the central offices of its police department and fire department into the building. A city-funded art gallery was also established on the first floor.
 From 1995 to 1999, the Southeastern Flower Show was held here.
 The building was closed to the public on March 29, 2010.

As Ponce City Market

The City sold the property for $27 million to Jamestown, a private-equity group, on July 11, 2011. Jamestown, which also invested in the redevelopment of the White Provision retail and restaurant complex in West Midtown, bankrolled the 180-million-dollar plans by developer Green Street Properties to convert it into a mixed-use development  In a July 2011 interview, Michael Phillips, managing director of Jamestown, said that Jamestown is focused on Ponce City Market becoming the fourth nationally relevant food hall in the U.S., alongside Pike Place in Seattle, the Ferry Building in San Francisco, and Jamestown's own Chelsea Market in New York City. Jamestown also plans rooftop gardens where local restaurants can grow food. Jamestown planned to complete renovations by early 2015 and then have the building added to the National Register of Historic Places.

It was hoped that the new development, along with the new adjacent BeltLine trail and Historic Fourth Ward Park, would stitch together the four neighborhoods that meet where it is located and revitalize the Ponce de Leon Avenue corridor.

In August 2012, a coffee house, Dancing Goats, opened in a temporary location at the southwest corner of the site in the renovated Sears auto service center building, which also houses the Jamestown offices.

Ponce City Market officially opened on August 25, 2014 with "Binders, General Assembly, and the Suzuki School join[ing] Dancing Goats Coffee Bar as the first tenants; the plans at that time being that on September 22, athenahealth, the building's first office tenant, would move 200 employees into the space and food trucks would also be on site starting that day, and residents of the Flats at Ponce would move in October through January."

History
 Old pictures of the Sears building
 "Largest Building in the South Opens on Ponce de Leon Avenue" "This Day in History" series, PBA (Public Broadcasting Atlanta) Online, orig. broadcast August 2, 2011
 Jerry R. Hancock, Jr., Dixie Progress: Sears, Roebuck & Co. and How it became an Icon in Southern Culture, Georgia State University - Photos of Sears Farmers' Market 1931 (see p. 61)
 "Living History" - video remembrances of the historic building by local residents

Redevelopment
 Robbie Brown, "Ambitious Plans for a Building Where Sears Served Atlanta", The New York Times, August 16, 2011
 "The lost world of City Hall East: the mysteries inside Atlanta’s largest abandoned building", Creative Loafing, April 19, 2010 - slideshow of pictures inside the City Hall East of April 2010
 Nick Kahler, "Ponce City: An Arcological Hierapolis for the Fountain of Youth," GA Tech Masters in Architecture Thesis, Spring 2012: A Theoretical Architectural Proposal for the Redevelopment of the Sears Building as a City within the City of Atlanta

References

External links

Official website
Official virtual tour website

Buildings and structures in Atlanta
Sears Holdings buildings and structures
City halls in Georgia (U.S. state)
Retail buildings in Georgia (U.S. state)
Mixed-use developments in Georgia (U.S. state)
Commercial buildings completed in 1926
Food markets in the United States
Old Fourth Ward
National Register of Historic Places in Fulton County, Georgia
Industrial buildings and structures in Georgia (U.S. state)
Adaptive reuse of industrial structures in Atlanta
Market halls
Food retailers
New Urbanism communities